Brian Santa Maria (born 12 September 1949) is a Malaysian field hockey player. He competed in the men's tournament at the 1972 Summer Olympics.

References

External links
 

1949 births
Living people
Malaysian male field hockey players
Olympic field hockey players of Malaysia
Field hockey players at the 1972 Summer Olympics
Place of birth missing (living people)
Asian Games medalists in field hockey
Asian Games bronze medalists for Malaysia
Medalists at the 1974 Asian Games
Field hockey players at the 1974 Asian Games